Sovínky is a market town in Mladá Boleslav District in the Central Bohemian Region of the Czech Republic. It has about 300 inhabitants.

Geography
It lies in a flat and mostly agricultural landscape in the Jizera Table.

History
The first written mention of Sovínky is from 1360. The village was promoted to a market town in 1594.

From 1972 to 1990, it was an administrative part of Bezno. Since 1990, it has been a sovereign municipality. The title of a market town was returned to Sovínky in 2006.

Sights
The main landmark of Sovínky is the Sovínky Castle from 1903. Another monument is the town hall, a historic house built in 1640.

Gallery

References

External links

Populated places in Mladá Boleslav District
Market towns in the Czech Republic